María Catrileo Chiguailaf de Codo (born 1944, Nueva Imperial) is a native Mapuche linguist and professor of Spanish,  English and Mapudungun language.

In 2009, Catrileo received the Provincial Prize for Conservation of National Monuments for her studies of the native Mapudungun language. Catrileo's work has focused on the phonology and morpho-syntax of the Mapudungun language and specially the verb forms. She is considered to be perhaps the only living Mapuche Indian to be a master of Spanish, English and Mapudungun. Currently, she is working the Institute of Linguistics and Literature of the Austral University of Chile, where she holds courses in Mapudungun.

References

20th-century Mapuche people
21st-century Mapuche people
Chilean people of Mapuche descent
Academic staff of the Austral University of Chile
Linguists from Chile
!Catrileo
Living people
Indigenous academics of the Americas
Mapuche linguists
Linguists of Mapuche
Mapuche women
Chilean women scientists
Linguists of indigenous languages of South America
People from Nueva Imperial
1944 births
20th-century linguists
21st-century linguists